This is a list of the National Register of Historic Places listings in La Salle County, Texas.

This is intended to be a complete list of properties and districts listed on the National Register of Historic Places in La Salle County, Texas. There are one district and two individual properties listed on the National Register in the county. One property is also a State Antiquities Landmark.

Current listings
The locations of National Register properties and districts may be seen in a mapping application provided.

|}

See also

National Register of Historic Places listings in Texas
Recorded Texas Historic Landmarks in La Salle County

References

See also

La Salle County, Texas
La Salle County
Buildings and structures in La Salle County, Texas
National Register of Historic Places in La Salle County, Texas